The purple-banded sunbird (Cinnyris bifasciatus) is a species of bird in the family Nectariniidae.
It is found in Angola, Botswana, Republic of the Congo, Democratic Republic of the Congo, Ethiopia, Eswatini, Gabon, Kenya, Malawi, Mozambique, Namibia, Rwanda, Somalia, South Africa, Tanzania, Uganda, Zambia, and Zimbabwe.

The Tsavo sunbird, sometimes lumped with the purple-banded, is here considered a separate species.

References

External links
 Purple-banded sunbird - Species text in The Atlas of Southern African Birds.

purple-banded sunbird
Birds of Sub-Saharan Africa
purple-banded sunbird
Taxonomy articles created by Polbot